"Gang Gang" (stylized in all caps) is a song by American record label Cactus Jack Records, known as JackBoys, and American rapper Sheck Wes. It was released from JackBoys' and Travis Scott's compilation album JackBoys (2019). The song was produced by WondaGurl and Vou. It was written by rappers Don Toliver, Sheck Wes, Travis Scott and Luxury Tax 50 (all of whom provide vocals), alongside the producers.

Composition and reception
The song's instrumental was originally used in American rapper Mar90s' December 2019 track, "Blue Hunnits" (featuring Slim Jxmmi), which was released two days prior. The song contains an interpolation of "Win" by Jay Rock. Kevin Cortez of HipHopDX, in a review of JackBoys, wrote that Sheck Wes "glides through 'Gang Gang' with a bag full of adlibs and charisma." Cortez described the song's hook (sung by Don Toliver with Sheck Wes and Travis Scott as backup vocals) as reminiscent of ASAP Rocky's "Babushka Boi", and the background humming as similar to that of Kid Cudi's.

Music video
The official music video was released along with a short film by JackBoys on December 27, 2019. Co-directed by Scott (under his alias Cactus Jack) and White Trash Tyler, the music video follows the events of the short film. It depicts Travis Scott as a bandit alongside his crew, consisting of Sheck Wes, Don Toliver and Chase B, who ride around in an abandoned parking lot. Scott is seen riding in a Tesla Cyberquad and Tesla Cybertruck, and playing with The Boring Company's Not-A-Flamethrower.

Charts

Certifications

References

2019 songs
Travis Scott songs
Sheck Wes songs
Songs written by Travis Scott
Songs written by Don Toliver
Songs written by WondaGurl